Kirsty Strain is a Scottish actress, best known for her roles in the popular comedy sketch series, Burnistoun, and as Angie Warren in the BBC Scotland television series, River City. In December 2016, she was a supporting actress to several acting pieces by St. Paul's High School, at the Tramway Theatre in Glasgow. She can most recently be seen in Outlander and the feature films, And Violet and Anna and the Apocalypse in 2022, Kirsty will compete in the inaugural Beautiful Scottish Acting Faces competition which will be held over 3 days in Oban.

Education and early career
Kirsty Strain attended Bannerman High School in Glasgow before enrolling at Langside College in the same city to study acting and performance. She later went on to study at the Lee Strasberg Theatre and Film Institute in New York in 2005, training under Paul Calderón where fellow alumni in her year included Margherita Missoni and Norwegian actress Sofie Cappelen. She remained in New York for three years, during which time she performed at the school's Marilyn Monroe Theatre and at the Independent Theatre in downtown New York.

Her interest in theatre and performance began with her early childhood experience at the Scottish Youth Theatre (SYT) which included performing with fellow SYT alumnus Sean Biggerstaff in a production of Sleeping Beauty at the Tron Theatre in Glasgow. Further theatre performances with the organisation included The Glory on the main stage of the Citizens Theatre in Glasgow and at His Majesty's Theatre in Aberdeen. She also performed in their 2002 production of Illyria at the Macrobert Arts Centre.

Career

Kirsty Strain's career began when she went on to work with the Scottish Youth Theatre's patrons, Blythe Duff and Colin McCredie in Taggart for STV in the role of Lisa Corrie in the programme's 99th episode, "So Long Baby" in 2009. This however, wasn't Kirsty's first television performance: That came in the form of the short film entitled, Rice, Paper, Stars in the roles of Ninja/Baby/Doll as part of the Tartan Shorts series for the BBC in 2000.

She worked on the feature film Up There. She appeared in the comedy sketch series Burnistoun for which she is a member of the principal cast, produced by The Comedy Unit. Strain has filmed three consecutive series, the third of which was televised in August 2012. She was a regular in the BBC One Scotland television series River City, in the recurring role of Angie Warren. She had a role in the BBC One drama, One of Us, and she most recently appeared in an episode of Outlander, which was televised in October 2017. Straing also worked on the feature film Anna and the Apocalypse, and appeared in a central role for the feature film And Violet, also in 2017.

Charities

She is an campaigner for ME awareness and supports the charities TYMES Trust and Share A Star.

Filmography

Film

Television

References

External links
 Official website
 
 Twitter feed

Living people
Scottish stage actresses
Scottish television actresses
Scottish film actresses
Actresses from Glasgow
Lee Strasberg Theatre and Film Institute alumni
Year of birth missing (living people)